Incodynerus is an andean neotropical genus of potter wasps currently containing 10 recognized species.

References

 Willink, A. 1969. Las especies del género Incodynerus Willink (Hym., Eumenidae). Acta Zool. Lilloana 24: 65–88.

Potter wasps